is the second studio album by the Japanese girl idol group Shiritsu Ebisu Chugaku. The album is set for release on January 28, 2015 on the Sony Music Entertainment Japan's label Defstar Records.

Background 
The album will be released in 2 versions: a regular edition (CD only) and a limited edition (CD+Blu-ray). The limited edition and the first press of the regular version will include a trading card (randomly selected from a set of 8 that includes a card for each member) as a bonus.

Track listing

CD

Blu-ray Disc (limited edition only) 
 (A B-sides-only performance by the 8-member lineup, for the first time on video)

Charts

References

External links 
 Shiritsu Ebisu Chugaku Album Kinpachi special website
 Profiles at Sony Music
 Kinpachi (limited edition)
 Kinpachi
 Discography — Shiritsu Ebisu Chugaku Official Site

Shiritsu Ebisu Chugaku albums
2015 albums
Defstar Records albums